Aeroflot Flight 101/X-20 ( Reys 101/X-20 Aeroflota) was a scheduled domestic passenger flight from Moscow to Alma-Ata via Omsk, Soviet Union, that crashed in low visibility conditions on 4 January 1965, killing 64 of the 103 people on board.

Aircraft 
The aircraft involved in the accident was an Ilyushin Il-18B registered CCCP-75685 to the Kazakh Civil Aviation Directorate of Aeroflot. The aircraft had sustained 6802 flight hours.

Crew 
Eight crew members were aboard the flight. The cockpit crew consisted of:
 Captain Konstantin Sergeevich Artamonov
 Check captain and Head of the Kazakh Civil Aviation Directorate Rishat Nurmukhametovich Azakov
 Co-pilot Nikolai Aleksandrovich Slamikhin
 Flight engineer Anatoliy Galiyevich Shakirov
 Navigator Vladimir Vasiliyevich Pristavka 
 Radio operator Nikolay Nikolayevich Safonov

Synopsis 
The flight was scheduled to depart from Domodedovo airport at 07:30 on January 4, but was delayed by necessary engine repairs. The flight did not depart from Domodedovo until 10:20 and arrived at Omsk airport at 15:52 Moscow time. The flight was supposed to depart from Omsk thereafter for a short flight to Alma-Ata. At the same time, head of the Kazakh aviation division R. Azakov had just returned from investigating a Mil Mi-4 crash and inspected the undercarriage of the Il-18 before it was cleared for the next leg of the journey.

At 20:32, a different Il-18, registered CCCP-75689, landed the runway with a 230° bearing after twice failing to land on the runway at a bearing of 50° and having to execute a go-around. After landing while taxiing at the airport the operations manager asked the Il-18 if it would be safe for another Il-18 to land in the same weather. The pilot responded by categorically denying that any Il-18 could safely land in the current conditions. In violation of procedures the controller did not inform the flight of visibility conditions or the altitude of the lower cloud boundary.

The landing was to be carried out on a bearing of 230°. The controller did warn of the presence of fog at the airport, but said that it had subsided a bit and it probably he did not expect visibility to go below the minimum safe level.

The visibility at the airfield had reached , well below the minimum safe distance; the controller did not inform the flight or the operations manager of the situation. The current conditions required the flight to be switched to the alternate airport but it was not. The non-directional beacon lights pulsed, but the aircraft began to deviate to the left slightly. The controller notified the crew of the deviation and instructed them to correct course by 2° and follow the lights to approach the runway. The crew confirmed hearing what the controller said and stated that they saw the beacon lights. The controller then instructed the flight to change course by 3°; the aircraft went from being slightly to the left of the runway to slightly to the right. The controller advised the crew to abort the landing and do a go-around, but the crew ignored the instruction and continued with the landing.

During the approach, check captain Azakov instructed the pilot-in-command Artamonov to conduct and instrument approach, while Azakov took on other landing duties. There was confusion among the crew at decision altitude (130 meters) because the controller told them to go-around due to visibility but both the navigator and inspector told the captain they saw the runway lights, leading the captain to continue the landing. Shortly thereafter the crew lost sight of the lights, but the captain was not aware that the rest of the crew lost sight of the lights; the captain then drew his attention away from his instruments to look for the lights, causing the aircraft to fly off course. When the controller commanded the flight to do a go-around, the inspector was looking for the lights while the pilot-in-command waited for him to instruct him to proceed with the go-around. Seconds before crashing the captain saw that the plane was about to crash and tried to avoid the collision with the ground, and only then did the Azakov command him to do a go-around.

The landing gear was torn off and the right wings separated from the rest of the plane. The left wing and fuselage were broken into several pieces, and a fire ignited, partially burning the wreckage. The radio operator, two flight attendants and 61 of passengers (including six children) were killed in the accident. Seventeen of the survivors sustained injuries.

Conclusions 
The causes of the accident were described as follows:
 The air traffic controller dispatching the flight for landing in weather below minimum safe conditions and not immediately informing the crew of such conditions;
 Crew error in executing the late missed approach and flying in unsafe weather.
A secondary cause of the accident was the failure of METAR to provide weather reports at 20:00, 20:15 and 20:30 when the bad weather intensified, which would have helped assist the flight to determine if it should have continued with the approach.

It was also noted that the head of the Kazakh Civil Aviation Directorate was not supposed to assist the crew on the flight, as he had already worked fifteen hours that day and did not have a medical certificate to fly.

References  

Aviation accidents and incidents in 1965
Aviation accidents and incidents in the Soviet Union
101/X-20
1965 in the Soviet Union
Accidents and incidents involving the Ilyushin Il-18
January 1965 events in Europe
Airliner accidents and incidents involving controlled flight into terrain
Airliner accidents and incidents involving fog
History of Almaty
1965 in the Kazakh Soviet Socialist Republic